Welesley Antonio Simplicio known as Neneca (born March 4, 1967) is a retired Brazilian football goalkeeper who is currently goalkeeping manager the Persian Gulf Pro League club Persepolis.

Managerial career

Persepolis 
In June 2022, Neneca named as goalkeeping coach of Iranian giants Persepolis. He replaced Davoud Fanaei in the team.

Honours

Player
Flamengo
 Copa Rio Sub-20: 1985
 Campeonato Carioca de Futebol Sub-20: 1985, 1986
 Taça Belo Horizonte de Juniores: 1986
 Copa do Brasil: 1990
 Copa Rio: 1991
 Campeonato Carioca: 1991

References

Sources

1967 births
Persepolis F.C. non-playing staff
Living people
Brazilian footballers
Association football goalkeepers
Americano Futebol Clube players
CR Flamengo footballers
América Futebol Clube (Três Rios) players
Madureira Esporte Clube players
Guarani FC players
América Futebol Clube (SP) players
Associação Portuguesa de Desportos players
Esporte Clube Pelotas players
Clube Atlético Bragantino players
Esporte Clube Noroeste players
Persian Gulf Pro League managers